Gerardo Gómez (born 3 April 1976) is a Mexican rower. He competed in the men's lightweight double sculls event at the 2000 Summer Olympics.

References

External links
 

1976 births
Living people
Mexican male rowers
Olympic rowers of Mexico
Rowers at the 2000 Summer Olympics
Rowers from Mexico City